The U.S. Highways in New Hampshire comprise six current and one former United States Numbered Highway in New Hampshire. There are three additional highway designations for pair of business routes and a bypass, and there were two other bypasses and a fourth business loop in the past.


Mainline highways

Special routes

See also

References

 
U.S.